Falcuna iturina is a butterfly in the family Lycaenidae. It is found in the Democratic Republic of the Congo (Ituri and North Kivu) and Uganda (the Bwamba Valley). The habitat consists of primary forests.

References

Butterflies described in 1963
Poritiinae